Asura nigrivena is a moth of the family Erebidae. It is found in China.

References

nigrivena
Moths described in 1899
Moths of Asia